Paloma Navares (born 1947) is an interdisciplinary Spanish artist who combines sculpture, photography, video and audio in her installations. Recurring themes in her work are the feminine condition, the historical representation of women through art, the critical analysis of the canon, madness, beauty and aging.

Biography 
Navares was born in Burgos, Spain. She lives and works in Madrid and Alicante in Spain.

In 1985-1986 she created Seravan; A Song for a Fallen Tree and Origin and Moonlit Nights which were mainly exhibited in art centers and museums in Europe. In 1997-98 she did the scenery design for The House of Forgetfulness and Bodies of Shadow and Light with the company Lanonima Imperial. In 2004 she did a scenery design project for the opera Juana by Enric Palomar, first performed in 2005 at the Opera House in Halle. Since she began her art career in 1979 she has exhibited in more than one hundred venues around the world and her work has been seen in fairs and art biennials.

Publications (selection)

References

External links 
 Official Web Page

1947 births
Living people
20th-century Spanish women artists
21st-century Spanish women artists
Spanish feminists
Interdisciplinary artists
Spanish women painters
People from Burgos